Kotikatu (The Home Street) is a Finnish drama television series which aired on Yle TV1 from August 24, 1995 to December 7, 2012. Kotikatu was titled as "a semi-soap opera".

It is the second longest running Finnish drama television series after soap opera Salatut elämät.

References

External links 
 

1995 Finnish television series debuts
2012 Finnish television series endings
1990s Finnish television series
2000s Finnish television series
2010s Finnish television series
Finnish drama television series
Helsinki in fiction
Yle original programming